, is a Japanese singer and actress. She is the elder sister of actress Yōko Ishino. Ishino is affiliated with From First Production Co., Ltd.

Discography

Albums
 Smile (07-25-1978)
 Mako II (12-05-1978)
 Mako Live I (06-01-1979)
 Mako III (08-25-1979)
 Koi no Disc Jockey MAKO IV (03-05-1980)
 Watashi no Shiawase MAKO 5 (07-21-1980)
 Twenty MAKO 6 (02-21-1981)
 Jeans ni Hakikaete MAKO 7 (07-05-1981)
 BYE BYE MAKO LIVE ~ 8 tsuki no taiyō yori moete ~  (10-05-1981)
 Saffron (10-21-1985)
 Truth (10-25-2003)
  (2004)
 Mako Revival (2005)
 Mirai (2006)
 Love Merry-go-round (08-20-2008)
 Watashi no Shiawase (2008)
 Life Is Beautiful (2010)

Singles
 "Ōkami nanka kowaku nai" (狼なんか怖くない) (1978) (Oricon: 17)
 "Watashi no Don" (わたしの首領) (1978) (Oricon: 26)
 "Shitsuren kinenbi" (失恋記念日) (1978) (Oricon: 24)
 "Nichiyōbi wa Stranger" (日曜日はストレンジャー) (1979) (Oricon: 19)
 "Pretty Pretty" (プリティー・プリティー) (1979) (Oricon: 26)
 "Wonder Boogie" (ワンダー・ブギ) (1979) (Oricon: 22)
 "Julie ga Rival" (ジュリーがライバル) (1979) (Oricon: 24)
 "Haru La! La! La!" (春ラ!ラ!ラ!) (1980) (Oricon: 16)
 "Heart de shōbu" (ハートで勝負) (1980) (Oricon: 15)
 "Memai" (めまい) (1980) (Oricon: 24)
 "Kare ga hatsu koi" (彼が初恋) (1980) (Oricon: 22)
 "Foggy Rain / Koi no Happy Date" (フォギー・レイン/恋のハッピー・デート) (1980) (Oricon: 27)
 "Omoikkiri Samba" (思いっきりサンバ) (1981) (Oricon: 42)
 "Irodori no toki" (彩りの季節) (1981) (Oricon: 35)
 "Koi no Summer Dance" (恋のサマー・ダンス) (1981) (Oricon: 41)
 "Burning Love" (バーニング・ラブ) (1981) (Oricon: 38)
 "Watashi no shiawase PART II" (私のしあわせ PART II) (1981) (Oricon: 56)
 "Ashita ni nareba" (明日になれば) (1982) (Oricon: 52)
 "Meguri ai" (めぐり逢い) (1985)
 "Glass no kanransha" (ガラスの観覧車) (1987)
 "Sora ni Canvas" (空にカンバス) (1987)
 "Kira Kira ∞" (2001)
 "Eve" (2005)
  (2007)
  (2010)

Videos
  (2010)
  (2010)
  (2010)

Selected filmography

Television
 The Kindaichi Case Files (1995) – Yumiko Ono
 Tokusou Sentai Dekaranger (2004) – Swan Shiratori/Deka Swan
 Hana Yori Dango (2005) - Makino Chieko
 Gunshi Kanbei (2014) – Konishi "Magdalena" Wakusa
 Lost Man Found (2022) – Satoru's mother
 Hikaru Kimi e (2024) – Fujiwara no Mutsuko

Film
 Hachiko Monogatari (1987) – Chizuko Ueno
 Tokusou Sentai Dekaranger The Movie: Full Blast Action (2004) – Swan Shiratori
 Tokusou Sentai Dekaranger vs. Abaranger (2005) – Swan Shiratori
 Mahou Sentai Magiranger vs. Dekaranger (2006) – Swan Shiratori
 Tokusou Sentai Dekaranger: 10 Years After (2015) – Swan Shiratori
 Nigakute Amai (2016)
 Neet Neet Neet (2018)
 Love and the Grand Tug-of-war (2021)

Dubbing
 Power Rangers S.P.D. (2005, 2011) – Narrator

References

External links
 (Victor Entertainment) 
Official blog 
Profile at From First Production Co., Ltd. 

JMDb profile 

Japanese idols
1961 births
Living people
Actors from Hyōgo Prefecture
Musicians from Hyōgo Prefecture
20th-century Japanese women singers
20th-century Japanese singers
21st-century Japanese women singers
21st-century Japanese singers
20th-century Japanese actresses
21st-century Japanese actresses
Singing talent show winners